Giannos Kranidiotis (Greek: Γιάννος Κρανιδιώτης; September 25, 1947, Nicosia, Cyprus — September 14, 1999, Bucharest, Romania) was a Greek diplomat and politician.

Son of the Cypriot diplomat, poet, and writer Nikos Kranidiotis, he studied law at the University of Athens and continued with postgraduate studies in international relations at Harvard and Sussex University.  Member of the Panhellenic Socialist Party (PASOK) from 1976, he was an advisor on the Cyprus dispute to prime minister Andreas Papandreou from 1981 to 1984. He held a number of important posts at the Greek Ministry of Foreign Affairs: secretary of European affairs (1984–1989), deputy foreign minister (July 8, 1994–January 1995 and from February 3, 1997), and alternate foreign minister (February 19, 1999 until his death).

Kranidiotis also served as a Member of the European Parliament (1995–1997) and was elected a member of PASOK's Central Committee in March 1999.  He held an honorary doctorate in international relations from the Democritus University of Thrace.

Kranidiotis, his son Nikolas, and four other people died aboard the presidential Dassault Falcon 900 airplane on their way to a six-nation Balkan foreign ministers' regional cooperation meeting in Bucharest. Twenty minutes before its landing in Bucharest the plane lost altitude and suffered severe in-flight pitch oscillations killing 7 and injuring 4 of its passengers.

External links
 Alternate FM Kranidiotis, 5 others die in airplane accident (Athens News Agency, 15 September 1999)

1947 births
1999 deaths
People from Nicosia
National and Kapodistrian University of Athens alumni
Harvard University alumni
Cypriot socialists
Greek Cypriot people
PASOK politicians
Victims of aviation accidents or incidents in Romania
Alumni of the University of Sussex